Elvis Forde (born 18 November 1959) is a retired Barbadian sprinter who specialized in the 400 metres. He was the flag bearer for his native country at the opening ceremony of the 1988 Summer Olympics.

He won the bronze medals at the 1985 Central American and Caribbean Championships and the 1986 Central American and Caribbean Games, and the gold medal at the 1987 Central American and Caribbean Championships.

At the 1984 Olympic Games he finished seventh in the 4 x 400 metres relay, together with teammates Richard Louis, David Peltier and Clyde Edwards. Their time of 3:01.60 minutes is still the Barbadian record.

Forde also competed in the individual distance at the 1984 Olympics. Here, he achieved his career best time of 45.32 seconds. He also competed at the 1987 World Indoor Championships and the 1988 Olympic Games.
Indoor, he was a 2-time winner of the 600-yard dash at the USA Indoor Track and Field Championships, the last 2 times the event was held before being converted into the 500 metres.
He is the former head track and field coach at Illinois State University in Bloomington-Normal, Illinois. Forde is now the head women's track & field coach at Temple University in Philadelphia, Pennsylvania.

References

External links

1959 births
Living people
Barbadian male sprinters
Athletes (track and field) at the 1984 Summer Olympics
Athletes (track and field) at the 1988 Summer Olympics
Olympic athletes of Barbados
Athletes (track and field) at the 1987 Pan American Games
Pan American Games competitors for Barbados
Competitors at the 1986 Central American and Caribbean Games
Central American and Caribbean Games bronze medalists for Barbados
Central American and Caribbean Games medalists in athletics